The Eurovision Young Dancers 1999 was the eighth edition of the Eurovision Young Dancers, held at the Opéra de Lyon, in Lyon, France, on 10 July 1999. Organised by the European Broadcasting Union (EBU) and host broadcaster France 3, dancers from ten countries participated in the televised final.

Both single dancers and couples younger than 20 could enter the competition, male or female. Single dancers had to perform 2 pieces of maximum 10 minutes in total, while couples could choose to perform 1 or 2 dances, but in total no longer than 10 minutes as well. The semi-final that took place in the same venue 6 days before the final (4 July 1999).

Katja Wünsche and Stegli Yohan of Germany won the contest, with Sweden and Spain placing second and joint third respectively.

Location

Opéra de Lyon, in Lyon, France, was the host venue for the 1999 edition of the Eurovision Young Dancers.

The Opéra Nouvel (Nouvel Opera House) in Lyon, France, is the home of the Opéra National de Lyon. The original opera house was re-designed by the distinguished French architect, Jean Nouvel between 1985 and 1993 in association with the agency of scenography dUCKS scéno and the acoustician Peutz. Serge Dorny was appointed general director in 2003.

Format
The format consists of dancers who are non-professional and between the ages of 16–21, competing in a performance of dance routines of their choice, which they have prepared in advance of the competition. All of the acts then take part in a choreographed group dance during 'Young Dancers Week'.

Jury members of a professional aspect and representing the elements of ballet, contemporary, and modern dancing styles, score each of the competing individual and group dance routines. The overall winner upon completion of the final dances is chosen by the professional jury members.

The interval act was a performance by the hip-hop dance group "Kä-fig".

Results

Preliminary round
A total of sixteen countries took part in the preliminary round of the 1999 contest, of which ten qualified to the televised grand final. The following countries failed to qualify.

Final
Awards were given to the top three countries. The table below highlights these using gold, silver, and bronze. The placing results of the remaining participants is unknown and never made public by the European Broadcasting Union.

Jury members 
The jury members consisted of the following:

  – Boris Eifman (Head of Jury)
  – Maguy Marin
  – Meryl Tankard
 / – Jean-Christophe Maillot
  – Tero Saarinen
  – Vicente Sáez
  – Victoria Maragopoulou

Broadcasting
Agnes Letestu, the 1989 Eurovision Young Dancers winner, commented on this year's contest for the host broadcaster France 3.

See also
 Eurovision Song Contest 1999

References

External links 
 

Eurovision Young Dancers by year
1999 in France
July 1999 events in Europe
Events in Lyon